Lo Manthang Palace (Nepali: लोमान्थाङ दरबार) is a historical palace in Nepal. It is located in 3800 m above sea level in Mustang district. The palace is under consideration to be listed in UNESCO World Heritage site.

History
The Lo Manthang Palace was built at around 15th Century by the first king of Mustang, king Amad Pal. He first built a fortress wall  around  the  settlement of Lo. Later, he constructed the four-storey palace in 1440 AD. Mustang was under the influence of Jumla in the 16th to 18th centuries. When Jumla was annexed to Nepal in 1789 AD, Mustang  became  an  integral  part  of  Nepal along  with  the palace. However, the king  of Mustang was recognized as a local king.

Architecture
The palace is five storied. It is constructed in mud, stone and wood with nine corners. There are wall paintings and inscriptions in Ranjana Script. The main entrance to the palace is in the east. The palace is painted with white lime. The palace houses a collection of texts such as Kanjur, Tenjur,  Astha Sahasrika Prajnaparamita and Satasahasrika Prajnaparmita. The wall around the palace and the city acts as fortress. Near the palace, there are three red monasteries, twelve chortens and a mani wall. There are 60 spouts and 25 doors in the fortress wall.

Conservation effort
The palace was damaged by Gorkha earthquake in 2015. The palace was restored with help from Gerda Henkel Foundation. The restoration was completed in 2073 BS.

Gallery

See also
Palaces in Nepal

References

Palaces in Nepal
15th-century establishments in Nepal
Forts in Nepal
Buildings and structures in Mustang District